Karl Arvid Daniel Jonsson (26 August 1886 in Bäckebo parish - 28 March 1960) was a Swedish farmer and politician. He was a member of Bondeförbundet, now the Centre Party. He was a member of the lower house in the bicameral parliament from 1936, chosen in the constituency of Kalmar County.

References
 This article was initially translated from the Swedish Wikipedia article.
 Tidens kalender 1937. Stockholm: Tidens förlag, 1936, sid. 127.
 Sveriges dödbok 1947–2006, (Cd-Rom), Sveriges Släktforskarförbund.

Members of the Riksdag from the Centre Party (Sweden)
1886 births
1960 deaths